K88 or K-88 may refer to:

K-88 (Kansas highway), a state highway in Kansas
INS Nirbhik (K88), a former Indian Navy ship